The House at 16–18 Preston Road in Somerville, Massachusetts is one of the city's finest Colonial Revival multiunit houses.  The three story wood-frame house was built c. 1910.  It has a flat roof with projecting eaves, and a modillioned cornice.  The front facade has a two-story porch, with each level supported by clusters of colonettes.  The house was built on the site of a former apple orchard owned by George Ireland; the street is named for Ireland's wife, Jane Preston Ireland.

The house was listed on the National Register of Historic Places in 1989.

See also
National Register of Historic Places listings in Somerville, Massachusetts

References

Houses on the National Register of Historic Places in Somerville, Massachusetts